Clusterin associated protein 1, also known as CLUAP1, is a human gene.

Model organisms

Model organisms have been used in the study of CLUAP1 function. A conditional knockout mouse line, called Cluap1tm1a(KOMP)Wtsi was generated as part of the International Knockout Mouse Consortium program — a high-throughput mutagenesis project to generate and distribute animal models of disease to interested scientists.

Male and female animals underwent a standardized phenotypic screen to determine the effects of deletion. Twenty six tests were carried out on mutant mice and four significant abnormalities were observed.  No homozygous mutant embryos were identified during gestation, and therefore none survived until weaning. The remaining tests were carried out on heterozygous mutant adult mice; both sexes had decreased IgG1 levels while males also displayed abnormal spine curvature resulting in kyphosis.

References

External links

Further reading 
 

Genes mutated in mice